Purgatory is the sixth studio album by Despised Icon. The album was released on November 15, 2019. It was produced by former guitarist Yannick St-Amand, similarly to the previous album Beast, though this time with co-lead vocalist Alex Erian and lead guitarist Eric Jarrin, both of whom wrote the album together with drummer Alex "Grind" Pelletier.

On September 20, The band embarked on a massive North American tour to promote "Purgatory" ahead of its release.

Track listing
"Dernier Souffle"  – 1:49
"Purgatory"  – 3:47
"Light Speed"  – 2:33
"Slow Burning"  – 3:16
"Snake in the Grass"  – 3:21
"Vies D'Anges"  – 2:53
"Moving On"  – 4:51
"Unbreakable"  – 3:09
"Apex Predator"  – 3:06
"Legacy"  – 3:26
"Dead Weight"  – 3:59

References

2019 albums
Despised Icon albums
Nuclear Blast albums